Talwara is a village located in the Ludhiana West tehsil, of Ludhiana district, Punjab.

Population

Villages in Ludhiana West Tehsil

Air travel connectivity 
The closest airport to the village is Sahnewal Airport.

References

Villages in Ludhiana West tehsil